Oxley Oval is an Australian cricket ground situated in Port Macquarie, New South Wales which hosted a 1979 World Series Cricket (WSC) match between the WSC West Indian XI and WSC World XI sides. The match, which began on 2 January, saw a seven-wicket West Indian victory thanks largely to four wickets by Wayne Daniel and a score of 83 by Viv Richards.

References

Cricket grounds in Australia
World Series Cricket venues
Port Macquarie